The President of the Trades Union Congress is a prominent but largely honorary position in British trade unionism.

History
Initially, the post of president was elected at the annual Trades Union Congress (TUC) itself, and would serve just for the duration of the congress.  Early standing orders stated that preference had to be given to a candidate from the city where the congress was being held; they were not necessarily well-known figures.

In 1900, the standing orders were changed to state that the presidency would be filled by the person who had chaired the Parliamentary Committee over the previous year.  As a result, before 1900, numerous people served as Chair of the Parliamentary Committee without becoming President; after this date, Presidents were prominent figures in the national trade union movement.  The Parliamentary Committee was replaced by the General Council in 1921, and the system continued.

There were still rare occasions where the Chair did not become President.  Margaret Bondfield, who was elected as Chair in 1923, resigned to accept a government post before becoming President.  George Isaacs, who was elected as Chair in 1944, similarly resigned to accept a government post, and was replaced by the vice-president, Ebby Edwards, who had presided over the previous year's congress.

In recent years, the President has once more been elected at the annual congress, but now officially fills the office for the remainder of the year and then presides over the following year's conference (in the years listed below).

Presidents to 1899

Presidents from 1900

See also
General Secretary of the TUC

References

Details of Past Congresses

 
 
Lists of British people
Trades Union Congress
Trades Union Congress